Sandra Charlene Greer (born Sandra Charlene Thomason, 1945) is an American physical chemist who has held important academic and administrative positions at both the University of Maryland, College Park and Mills College.  Her area of study is the thermodynamics of fluids, especially polymer solutions and  phase transitions. She has received awards for her scientific contributions, and for her advocacy for women in science and her work on ethics in science.

Education 
Sandra C. Greer studied chemistry and mathematics at Furman University in Greenville, South Carolina, receiving her Bachelor of Science degree in 1966. She then went to the University of Chicago where she received her master's degree in 1968 and her Ph.D. in 1969 in chemical physics.

Career
In 1969 Sandra Greer joined the National Institute of Standards and Technology (NIST) in Gaithersburg, Maryland, where she worked the Heat Division until 1978. Greer helped to found NIST's Standards Committee for Women (SCW) and advocated for equitable treatment of women at NIST.

In 1978 she joined the University of Maryland, College Park, where she was the first woman to be hired on a regular research track in the Department of Chemistry and Biochemistry. She was promoted to full professor in 1983. From 1987 to 1988 she chaired the President's Committee on Undergraduate Education, developing an extensive report, Making a Difference for Women. Also known as the Greer Report, it became the university's blueprint for the advancement of women.  She held a number of administrative posts at Maryland, including serving as the first woman department chair of Chemistry and Biochemistry between 1990 and 1993.

In addition to being a professor in the Department of Chemistry and Biochemistry, she became a professor in the Department of Chemical and Biomolecular Engineering in 1995, where she was the department's first tenured woman faculty member. She also developed a program of ethics courses for scientists, with the intention of teaching students "how to recognize an ethical dilemma when they see one, and how to think through it."

In 2008, Sandra C. Greer became Provost and Dean of the Faculty at Mills College in Oakland, California, where she was also Professor of Chemistry and Physics, and holder of the Scheffler Pre-Health Science Chair. She retired as Provost and Dean in 2013, and retired fully in 2015.

She has been committed throughout her career to ensuring that more women pursue a scientific career. At the national level, she helped to found the Committee for the Advancement of Women in the Chemical Sciences (COACh) in 1998.  In 2014, she received the American Chemical Society's Award for Encouraging Women into Careers in the Chemical Sciences.

Awards and honors 
Greer is a member of the American Physical Society (1987), the  American Chemical Society, the American Association for the Advancement of Science (1994), and the Association for Women in Science.  She is a fellow of the American Physical Society (1986) and the American Academy of Arts and Sciences.
 
Greer has received numerous awards. In 2004, she received the Garvan–Olin Medal from the American Chemical Society, "for her contributions to the physical chemistry of critical phenomena in fluids and of reversible polymerizations in synthetic polymers" and for her advocacy and work on ethics.

She received the Award for Encouraging Women into Careers in the Chemical Sciences from the American Chemical Society in 2014.

External links 
 Sandra C. Greer Professor of Chemistry, Scheffler Pre-Health Science Chair. Department of Chemistry, Mills College.

References 

1945 births
21st-century American chemists
Living people
American women chemists
Recipients of the Garvan–Olin Medal
Fellows of the American Physical Society
Fellows of the American Academy of Arts and Sciences
21st-century American women scientists